Archive on 4, previously The Archive Hour, is a BBC Radio 4 programme which uses audio clips mainly sourced from the BBC Sound Archive to illustrate a different theme in each edition.

A variety of guest speakers, often with a connection to the week's subject, present the show.

The programme is broadcast on Saturday evenings at 8pm in the United Kingdom, and an archive of past issues is available to listen again.

The first edition of The Archive Hour, presented by Claire Rayner, was broadcast on 11 April 1998.  The programme title was changed to Archive on 4 from 3 January 2009.

References

External links 

Archives in the United Kingdom
BBC Radio 4 programmes
British documentary radio programmes